Larry C. "Bumper" Robinson II is an American film, television and voice actor. He is known for his roles as Bumblebee and Blitzwing on Transformers: Animated, Falcon on Avengers Assemble and Cyborg in Justice League: Doom.

Career
Robinson's first theatrical break came as the son of O. J. Simpson's character in Cocaine and Blue Eyes (1983), a CBS television movie. Years later, he would be cast in the role of the young O. J. Simpson in The O. J. Simpson Story (1995).

In the 1980s, Robinson played Zammis in Enemy Mine, Clarence on Amen, Jonah Carver on Days of Our Lives and a recurring role as Leon on NBC's Night Court. He has made appearances on The Jeffersons, Gimme a Break!, Hill Street Blues, Matt Houston, Cagney & Lacey, Webster, Punky Brewster, The Facts of Life and Family Matters. He began his voice-over career on The Flintstone Kids as Philo Quartz, followed by work on Scooby-Doo, among others.

Robinson's career continued into the 1990s, with work on Star Trek: Deep Space Nine, the FOX television movie Generation X, and shows like Hangin' with Mr. Cooper, The Client, Touched by an Angel, The Steve Harvey Show, Sister, Sister and The John Larroquette Show. He earned rave reviews for his performance as Jackie Jackson in ABC's miniseries, The Jacksons: An American Dream, after which he joined the cast of A Different World as Dorian Heywood. He also played Jared Harris on Guys Like Us, Marcus Miller on The WB's Three, a recurring role as Ivan Ennis on Living Single and Marcus Wentworth on UPN's Grown Ups.

In 2001, Robinson starred alongside Phylicia Rashad in the PBS film The Old Settler. Not long after, he starred in an American-Chinese produced action series called Flatland, with Dennis Hopper which was filmed in Shanghai. He joined the cast of Sabrina The Teenage Witch in 2003, after which he headed to New Mexico to star in Death Valley.

He has appeared in CSI: NY, Bones, Jane Doe: Yes I Remember It Well, Roommates, Alcatraz and BET's The Game.

In addition, Robinson is also a prominent voice actor with roles in animated films and television shows such as Scooby-Doo and the Ghoul School, Pinky and the Brain, Futurama, Brother Bear and Teenage Mutant Ninja Turtles. He also provided the voices of Bumblebee, Blitzwing, Porter C. Powell and Blackout on Transformers: Animated.

Filmography

Live-action

Film

Television

Voice acting

Film

Television

Video games

Theme parks

References

External links
 
 Bumper Robinson on Fandango

Living people
African-American male actors
American male child actors
American male film actors
American male television actors
Place of birth missing (living people)
American male video game actors
American male voice actors
Year of birth missing (living people)
21st-century African-American people